A bullpen or bull pen may refer to:

Literally, a pen or enclosure for bulls
In baseball, the bullpen, an area for pitchers to warm up, also the location of relief pitchers
A fortified ridge at the Siege of Port Hudson
Broadly, any group of people kept together or in reserve for a common goal, such as the staff of Marvel Comics' Bullpen Bulletins

Open areas holding large groups of people, such as:
The bull pen or bull system, where Australian waterfront workers' under the Dog collar act were hired for the day
Temporary prison-like areas in the United States for miners arrested for trying to organize into unions
An open plan office layout, especially that of local law enforcement
The fan zone of NRG Stadium
A round pen with solid-walled sides for training horses
A holding cell that contains a large number of prisoners
A prison yard or open area where prisoners are held
An open area in a prison camp
A system of prostitution, credited to Jean O'Hara, where a single prostitute would work three rooms in rotation

See also
Toril (disambiguation)